"Thanks to Them" is the season three premiere of the American animated television series The Owl House, and the 41st overall episode of the series.

The episode premiered on October 15, 2022 on both Disney Channel and Disney XD. It received acclaim from critics and audiences, with praise for its animation, writing, representation, use of time, and emotional themes.

Plot
Following the events of "King's Tide", Luz and her mother are reunited. After hearing about their situation, Camila takes in Luz's friends and shelters them. They spend the next couple of months trying to find a way back to the Demon Realm, during which Amity, Willow, Hunter, and Gus adjust to the human world, Luz comes out to her mother as bisexual, introducing Amity as her girlfriend, and Vee creates herself a new human identity. Near late October, while Luz is at school, her friends find a small box in the floorboard of the abandoned house next to the Noceda residence. They discover a map inside, believing it could lead to something related to the portal. The next day, they go off to explore the town and learn about the map while Hunter stays behind because he feels that Emperor Belos might have followed them from the Demon Realm. Upon arriving at the Gravesfield Historical Society, Masha, the curator and a friend of Vee from the time she posed as Luz, informs them that the map contains a rebus. After decoding it, they realize the map shows where Titan's Blood is being kept. Amity decides to surprise Luz with the discovery at the annual Gravesfield Halloween Festival as a way to celebrate their last days in the Human Realm.

Meanwhile, Hunter tells Luz his worries about Belos, so they go to the abandoned house to investigate. After only finding a possum there, they think they are safe, but Hunter is unknowingly possessed by Belos. When they return home, everyone is working on their Halloween costumes. Gus suggests that he and Hunter should dress up as the characters of their favorite novel, Cosmic Frontier, while Amity suggests that she and Luz should be Hecate and Azura respectively from The Good Witch Azura books. While they go to the Halloween Festival, Camila and Vee stay home to handle trick or treaters, during which Camila discovers Luz's video diary where she decides to stay in the Human Realm permanently, thinking it would be the best for everyone.

At the Festival, the group attends the Haunted Hayride, led by Masha, where they learn the story of the Wittebane brothers: two orphaned boys, Philip and Caleb, came to Gravesfield and became witch hunters until Caleb met and fell in love with a witch named Evelyn, and followed her to the Demon Realm with Philip following in pursuit. Hunter has another vision of Belos and tells Luz about the surprise Amity had planned for her, suggesting they should find the Titan's Blood first to make sure the others won't get into trouble. The map leads them to a swamp in the town graveyard where Luz discovers that her glyph magic is working again as they get closer to Titan's Blood. With that discovery, Belos takes full control over Hunter's body and tries to kill Luz. After Camila and Vee meet up with the others, they all arrive to help Luz and fight Belos. When Belos tries to destroy Hunter's palisman, Flapjack, Hunter regains control over his body and throws the vial with the Titan's Blood into the water. Belos jumps after it, causing Hunter to almost drown, but Camila rescues him. Belos leaves Hunter's body, uses the Blood to open a portal to the Demon Realm to finish his mission of annihilating all witch kind, and escapes through it. Hunter nearly dies, so Flapjack sacrifices himself to revive him.

As everyone mourns Flapjack, Luz finally confesses to her friends that she met Philip in the past and unknowingly helped in his plans to destroy the Boiling Isles. Before she can reveal her decision to stay in the Human Realm, Camila quickly announces that she will join them in the Demon Realm to stop Belos and save the Isles. Luz's friends comfort Luz  before they all enter the portal. Vee decides to stay behind to keep up appearances. Assuring Luz that she is ready for what comes next, Camila takes her daughter's hand and they go through the portal together before it closes.

Production 
According to show creator Dana Terrace, production for the final season was anticipated for a full 20-episode season. However, despite the popularity of the series, The Walt Disney Company would cut short the third season down into three 44-minute episodes. Terrace would not say that Disney had cut the show due to the show's LGBTQ+ content, despite the show being banned in several countries for that reason, saying in a Reddit AMA that "While we have had issues airing in a few countries (and are just straight up banned in a few more) I'm not gonna assume bad faith against the people I work with in LA." She would instead say that "At the end of the day, there are a few business people who oversee what fits into the Disney brand and one day one of those guys decided [The Owl House] didn't fit that 'brand'...  The story is serialized (BARELY compared to any average anime lmao), our audience skews older, and that just didn't fit this one guy's tastes. That's it! Ain't that wild?" Terrace would also say that she would have no say about the show's cut in production.

Fan response to the cutting of the episodes was extremely negative, with many starting campaigns and petitions to try and get Disney to reverse the decision and air a full season. However, Terrace expressed that the decision "was set in stone" and that she could do nothing about it.

In a panel at the 2022 New York Comic Con, Terrace expressed disappointment at the show's cutting, but praised the production crew for trying despite the cutting, saying "What can you do at this point? We did our best."

Music 
Starting with this episode, season 2 composer Brad Breeck worked alongside Andrew Smith on the show's score. Breeck released the score for "Thanks to Them" on his YouTube account as a one-hour video, with "chapters" dividing each individual track.

Ratings 
This episode was watched by 260,000 viewers on Disney Channel and a combined audience of 349,000 viewers including the simulcast on Disney XD.

Release 
After the episode aired on Disney Channel, it was posted to the network's YouTube page and amassed over one million views within 24 hours.

Promotion 
On September 16, 2022, a promotional poster was released on show creator Dana Terrace's social media platforms, revealing the release date of the episode. According to writer Jade King, the poster had hinted on a significant time skip, potentially months after the last episode, "King's Tide," due to the change in appearance of several characters, including Luz's mom, Camila, having strands of grey hair and Hunter having a new haircut. This was later confirmed by King, who had looked into cable listings for the episode.

On October 6, 2022, the first six-minutes of the episode was previewed at the New York Comic Con panel. Later, two clips from the six-minute segment were released to the general public, with the first clip showcasing Luz Noceda's mother, Camila taking care of Hunter, Gus, Amity, Willow, and Vee as the aforementioned first four try to adapt to an unfamiliar human world. In the second clip, Luz laments over the previous events in the Demon Realm, believing that the events were her fault, while Hunter tries to console her. He cautiously hushes Luz as she mentions that he is a Grimwalker, since the prospect of the others discovering this makes him anxious. The two make a pact to keep these revelations a secret until they feel ready to come clear.

Critical reception 
Lee Arvoy, writer for TV Source Magazine, called the episode "a great way to kick off the first of the three Season Three specials. It felt completely focused, yet full of many great moments." Patrick Gunn, writer for Collider, praised the episode for its depiction of grief. Heather Hogan, writer for Autostraddle, praised the episode's LGBTQ+ representation saying that it was "gayer than every other gay Disney and Marvel thing combined, and that was clearly very on purpose." Petrana Radulovic, writer for Polygon, praised the depiction of Camila Noceda. Jade King, writer for TheGamer, praised the episode's writing, use of its time, animation, LGBTQ+ representation, and character dynamics.

References 

The Owl House episodes
2022 American television episodes
Television episodes set in Connecticut
Halloween television episodes
2022 in LGBT history
LGBT-related animated television episodes
American LGBT-related television episodes
Television episodes about single parent families
Television episodes about death
Television episodes about murder
Television episodes about spirit possession
Television episodes about sacrifices
Fratricide in fiction
Grief in fiction